Tuvia may refer to
Tuvia (given name)
Be'er Tuvia, a moshav in Israel
Be'er Tuvia Regional Council